Osobnica  is a village in the administrative district of Gmina Jasło, within Jasło County, Subcarpathian Voivodeship, in south-eastern Poland.

The village has a population of 3,536.

References

Osobnica